Lumiflavin is a toxic product of photolysis of vitamin B2.

References

Poisons
Flavins
Imides